Aotearoa International Ltd v Scancarriers A/S [1985] 1 NZLR 513  is a cited case in New Zealand regarding contract formation.

Background
Aotearoa International was in the business of paper recycling, and were looking to expand by exporting to India, and was discussing with Scancarriers of shipping 4 shiploads of 1,000 tons each.

As a result of these negotiations, Scancarriers sent the following telex "FLWG OUR DISCUSSION ON FRIDAY [...] WE AGREE TO A PROMOTIONAL RATE OF US$120 [...] AND THIS RATE WILL BE HELD UNTIL 29/7/82 [...]."

However, when Aotearoa delivered the first shipment of 919 tons, Scancarriers only had space to ship some of the paper, with the remaining 271 tons being shipped on a subsequent ship.

The split sailings caused cashflow problems for Aotearoa, leaving them unable to pay for the shipping costs for the second shipment resulting in Sancarriers selling the paper to recoup the shipping costs.

Aotearoa sued for breach of contract.

Held
The Court ruled that the telex was merely a quote, and not an offer, as Aotearoa's manager admitted during cross examination that the normal shipping practice was that a freight contract only starts when the freight is delivered to the port and accepted for loading.

References

New Zealand contract case law
1985 in case law
1985 in New Zealand law
Judicial Committee of the Privy Council cases on appeal from New Zealand